Akshatha Rao (born 22 December 1983) is an American cricketer. In August 2019, she was named in United States' squad for the 2019 ICC Women's World Twenty20 Qualifier tournament in Scotland. She made her Women's Twenty20 International (WT20I) debut for the United States women's cricket team on 31 August 2019, against Scotland, in the 2019 ICC Women's World Twenty20 Qualifier. She was the leading wicket-taker for the United States in the tournament, with four dismissals in five matches.

In February 2021, she was named in the Women's National Training Group by the USA Cricket Women's National Selectors ahead of the 2021 Women's Cricket World Cup Qualifier and the 2021 ICC Women's T20 World Cup Americas Qualifier tournaments. In September 2021, she was named in the American team for the World Cup Qualifier tournament. In October 2021, she was named in the American team for the 2021 Women's Cricket World Cup Qualifier tournament in Zimbabwe.

References

External links
 

1983 births
Living people
People from Shimoga
Cricketers from Karnataka
Indian emigrants to the United States
American people of Kannada descent
American sportspeople of Indian descent
American women cricketers
United States women Twenty20 International cricketers
Place of birth missing (living people)
21st-century American women